Iványi is a surname. Notable people with the surname include:

Béla Iványi-Grünwald (1867–1940), Hungarian painter, member of the Nagybánya artists' colony, founder of the Kecskemét artists' colony
Gyula von Iványi (1864–1920), Hungarian Olympic fencer
István Szent-Iványi (born 1958), Hungarian politician and Member of the European Parliament for the Alliance of Free Democrats
Iványi (river), a tributary of the Zagyva in northern Hungary